The Côte Vermeille (meaning "vermilion coast") is a region in the French department of Pyrénées-Orientales on the Mediterranean Coast near the border with Spain. The Côte Vermeille stretches from Argelès-sur-Mer to the border village of Cerbère. The towns of Collioure, Port-Vendres and Banyuls-sur-Mer are nested along a 20 km stretch of beaches, small bays, creeks and coves.

See also 
 Paulilles
 Natura 2000
 Route départementale 914

Landforms of Pyrénées-Orientales
Protected areas of France
Northern Catalonia
Vermeille